The Haji Sultanali Mosque is a local mosque located on 75 Salatyn Askerova Str., Yasamal district, Baku.

History 
The Haji Sultanali Mosque was built in the beginning of the 20th century. The architect of the mosque is Zivar bay Ahmadbayov. The mosque was built on the initiative of the millionaire Haji Sultanali from 1904 to 1910. It is located in the city of Baku, not far from the Nizami metro station. A grave of a Turkish soldier was discovered on the territory of the mosque. 

The mosque has two floors. The top floor is for women and the first floor is for men. The plan depicts the square shape of the edifice. The mosque has a dome and a minaret. It was originally built without a minaret. The building includes features of the European, Eastern and local architecture.

In April 2000, the reconstruction and restoration work began which completed in October 2001, and the mosque was put into operation.

Gallery

See also 
 Juma Mosque
 Taza Pir Mosque
 Ajdarbey Mosque

References

Mosques in Baku
Architecture in Azerbaijan
20th-century mosques